Thayin Madiyil is a 1964 Indian Tamil-language film directed by Adurthi Subba Rao, starring M. G. Ramachandran and B. Saroja Devi. It was released on 18 December 1964.

Plot 

Raja, a champion jockey leads a very happy and disciplined life. Raja meets Jeeva, the only daughter of a wealthy businessman, Bhupathi, and both fall head over heels in love with each other. Raja is an orphan. Years later, he learns of his mother and the injustice meted out to her in life. Raja vows to find his father and take revenge. Raja is overjoyed to meet his mother who he believed was dead, but his happiness is short lived, when his mother reveals that he is the son of Bhupathi.

Cast 
The list adapted from the book Thiraikalanjiyam Part-2.

Male cast
M. G. Ramachandran as Raja
M. N. Nambiar
M. R. Radha
Nagesh
T. S. Muthaiah
Thirupathisamy

Female cast
B. Saroja Devi as Jeeva
Pandari Bai
Manorama
Geetanjali
G. Sakunthala
Lakshmiprabha

Production 
The film was produced by K. R. Balan under the banner Annai Films and was directed by A. Subba Rao. R. R.Chandran handled the cinematography while Sornam wrote the screenplay and dialogues.

Soundtrack 
Music was composed by S. M. Subbaiah Naidu while the lyrics were penned by Kannadasan and Vaali.

Reception 
Writing for Sport and Pastime, T. M. Ramachandran said, "The story follows the beaten track and in a nutshell, the audience get the same kind of dish they are used to. A striking feature that stands out, however, in the film is the acting of M. G Ramachandran".

References

External links 
 

1960s Tamil-language films
1964 films
Films directed by Adurthi Subba Rao
Films scored by S. M. Subbaiah Naidu